Rodrigo Parreira da Silva (born 9 September 1994) is a Brazilian Paralympic athlete. He represented Brazil at the 2016 Summer Paralympics held in Rio de Janeiro, Brazil and he won two medals: the silver medal in the men's long jump T36 event and the bronze medal in the men's 100 metres T36 event.

At the 2017 World Para Athletics Championships held in London, United Kingdom, he won the bronze medal in the men's 200 metres T36. He also won the silver medal in the men's long jump T36 event and the bronze medal in the men's 100 metres T36 event.

Notes

References

External links 
 

1994 births
Living people
Brazilian male sprinters
Brazilian male long jumpers
Paralympic athletes of Brazil
Paralympic silver medalists for Brazil
Paralympic bronze medalists for Brazil
Paralympic medalists in athletics (track and field)
Athletes (track and field) at the 2016 Summer Paralympics
Athletes (track and field) at the 2020 Summer Paralympics
Medalists at the 2016 Summer Paralympics
Medalists at the 2015 Parapan American Games
Medalists at the 2019 Parapan American Games
Sportspeople from Goiás
21st-century Brazilian people